Kalkstein is a surname. Notable people with the surname include:

Ludwik Kalkstein (1920–1994), Polish Nazi collaborator
Meghan Kalkstein, American journalist

See also
 Kalckstein, Prussian noble family